The Portland LumberJax were a lacrosse team based in Portland, Oregon playing in the National Lacrosse League (NLL). The 2006 season was the LumberJax inaugural season, and they became the first expansion team in NLL history to win its division. The playoffs were not so kind to the LumberJax however, as they were eliminated in the Western Division semi-finals by the Arizona Sting.

Portland's regular season success was recognized when the NLL handed out its end-of-season awards. Brodie Merrill was named both Rookie of the Year and Defensive Player of the Year, Derek Keenan was named both coach and GM of the year, and owner Angela Batinovich was named Executive of the Year.

Regular season

Conference standings

Game log
Reference:

Playoffs

Game log
Reference:

Player stats
Reference:

Runners (Top 10)

Note: GP = Games played; G = Goals; A = Assists; Pts = Points; LB = Loose Balls; PIM = Penalty minutes

Goaltenders
Note: GP = Games played; MIN = Minutes; W = Wins; L = Losses; GA = Goals against; Sv% = Save percentage; GAA = Goals against average

Awards

Transactions

Trades

Roster
Reference:

See also
2006 NLL season

References

Portland
2006 in sports in Oregon